Saoco is a type of Cuban rum with coconut water.

Saoco may also refer to:
Saoco (band), Cuban-style conjunto from New York
"Saoco", 1954 song written by Rosendo Ruiz Jr., recorded by Celia Cruz with Sonora Matancera, Conjunto Libre and others
"Saoco", 1958 song written by singer Pellín Rodríguez, recorded by Cortijo y Su Combo
"Saoco", 1971 song written by Armando Peraza, recorded by Mongo Santamaría
"Saoco", 2004 song by Wisin from El Sobreviviente
"Saoko", 2022 song by Rosalía
"Mi saoco", 1955 song by Benny Moré